Hengstler Can refer to the following:

People
 Friedrich Hengstler (1913–1998), Oberleutnant in the Wehrmacht

Organizations
 Hengstler GmbH, a manufacturing company owned by Fortive, Inc.